TLV1 is an English-language podcast network based in Tel Aviv, Israel. It was founded by Silicon Valley entrepreneur and venture capitalist Avner Shelem, and broadcasts from its studios at Kikar HaMedina.

Podcasts
Streetwise Hebrew – a weekly bite-size podcast that discusses modern Hebrew language gems. From slang to etymology, host Guy Sharett explains Israeli psyche, society, and culture through its language.
The Promised Podcast – an inside view of how Israel can warm your heart and make your blood boil. It is a show by a journalist, a professor and an NGO guy who all live in and love Israel even though it drives them crazy, and who each week discuss the latest in Israeli politics, culture and society. Hosted by Noah Efron, Allison Kaplan Sommer, and Don Futterman.
Tel Aviv Review – hosts Gilad Halpern and Dahlia Scheindlin interview scholars, writers and thinkers for in-depth, long-form discussions about their work and ideas that make up the debate in and about Israel.
Israel In Translation – a weekly podcast exploring Israeli literature in English translation. Host Marcela Sulak takes listeners through Israel's literary countryside, cityscapes, and psychological terrain, and the lives of the people who create it.
Kol Cambridge – a showcase of the amazing talent and range of Israeli musicians, past and present.

References

External links

2013 establishments in Israel
Internet radio stations
Mass media in Tel Aviv
Podcasting companies